The Kavasila–Kyllini railway was a meter gauge railway line of the Piraeus, Athens and Peloponnese Railways (SPAP) in Elis, Greece. It branched off the Patras–Kyparissia railway at the railway station of Kavasila. This 17 km long line served the port of Kyllini, from which ferries sail to Zakynthos island. Services on this branch started in August 1891 and lasted until 1988, with full services and with limited services until 1996, when the line was closed down. It has been partially dismantled since then.

The line had railway stations in Vartholomio, Neochori and Kyllini. At Vartholomio the Vartholomio–Loutra Kyllinis railway branched off.

References

Railway lines in Greece
Elis
Metre gauge railways in Greece